Germanopolis may refer to:
 Germantown, Philadelphia, USA
 Germanicopolis (Paphlagonia), Asia Minor